Potentilleae is a tribe of the rose family, Rosaceae. 

The type genus is Potentilla.

Genera  
 Alchemilla (lady's mantle)
 Aphanes (parsley-piert)
 Argentina (silverweeds)
 Chamaecallis
 Chamaerhodos
 Comarum
 Dasiphora
 Drymocallis
 Fragaria (strawberries)
 Horkelia
 Horkeliella
 Ivesia (mousetails)
 Potaninia
 Potentilla (cinquefoils, tormentils, barren strawberries)
 Sibbaldia
 Sibbaldianthe

References

External links  

 
Rosales tribes